Erigonoplus is a genus of  dwarf spiders that was first described by Eugène Louis Simon in 1884.

Species
 it contains twenty-three species:
Erigonoplus castellanus (O. Pickard-Cambridge, 1875) – Portugal, Spain
Erigonoplus depressifrons (Simon, 1884) – Portugal, Spain, France
Erigonoplus dilatus (Denis, 1950) – Andorra
Erigonoplus foveatus (Dahl, 1912) – Europe, Russia (Europe, Caucasus)
Erigonoplus globipes (L. Koch, 1872) – Europe, Turkey, Armenia
Erigonoplus inclarus (Simon, 1881) (type) – France (Corsica)
Erigonoplus inspinosus Wunderlich, 1995 – Greece
Erigonoplus jarmilae (Miller, 1943) – Austria, Czech Rep., Slovakia, Albania, Russia (Europe, Caucasus)
Erigonoplus justus (O. Pickard-Cambridge, 1875) – Belgium, France, Germany
Erigonoplus kirghizicus Tanasevitch, 1989 – Kazakhstan
Erigonoplus latefissus (Denis, 1968) – Morocco
Erigonoplus minaretifer Eskov, 1986 – Russia (Middle, north-eastern Siberia)
Erigonoplus nasutus (O. Pickard-Cambridge, 1879) – Portugal, France
Erigonoplus nigrocaeruleus (Simon, 1881) – France (Corsica), Italy (Sardinia, mainland), Iran
Erigonoplus ninae Tanasevitch & Fet, 1986 – Turkmenistan, Iran
Erigonoplus nobilis Thaler, 1991 – Italy
Erigonoplus sengleti Tanasevitch, 2008 – Iran
Erigonoplus setosus Wunderlich, 1995 – Croatia, Greece
Erigonoplus sibiricus Eskov & Marusik, 1997 – Russia (South Siberia)
Erigonoplus simplex Millidge, 1979 – France, Italy, Bulgaria, Greece
Erigonoplus spinifemuralis Dimitrov, 2003 – Greece (incl. Crete), Albania, Macedonia, Bulgaria, Ukraine, Russia (Europe), Turkey
Erigonoplus turriger (Simon, 1881) – France, Spain
Erigonoplus zagros Tanasevitch, 2009 – Iran

See also
 List of Linyphiidae species (A–H)

References

Araneomorphae genera
Linyphiidae
Spiders of Africa
Spiders of Asia